Fluor Field at the West End is a 6,700-seat baseball-only stadium in Greenville, South Carolina, that opened on April 6, 2006. Designed by architectural firm DLR Group, it was built as a new home of the Greenville Drive baseball team, the High-A East affiliate of the Boston Red Sox.

Features
Fluor Field nearly replicates the dimensions of Fenway Park, home of the Red Sox. The ballpark has its own "Green Monster" replica, a 30-foot high wall in left field as opposed to the 37-foot one found at Fenway, and contains a manual scoreboard. Every other dimension is to the same specifications as Fenway Park, including "Pesky’s Pole" in right field. Other than the tribute to Fenway, Fluor Field also pays tribute to the Greenville area as the ballpark's nostalgic look utilizes reclaimed bricks from local mills. As is the tradition in Fenway Park, Neil Diamond's "Sweet Caroline" is sung in the middle of the seventh inning. Fluor Field is adjacent to the Shoeless Joe Jackson Museum.

In 2007, the Greenville Drive privately funded the enhancement of Fluor Field at a cost of approximately $1.5 million. One of these enhancements include a display regarding Greenville's baseball heritage with information about players who were either born or played in the upstate region.

On February 26, 2008, the stadium was officially renamed to Fluor Field at the West End. The field was named for Fluor Corporation, a major local employer.

Events
The field hosted the 2009, 2012 and 2013 Southern Conference baseball tournaments as well as the 2016 and 2017 editions. It will continue to do so until at least 2019.

Since 2010, the field has hosted a neutral site game of the Reedy River Rivalry between the Clemson Tigers and South Carolina Gamecocks. The lone exception was in 2012, when that year's neutral site game was played in Charleston. Fluor Field hosts the second of three games spread out over a weekend on a Saturday, as the Friday and Sunday contests rotate yearly between the respective home fields for the two schools. The Gamecocks, as of 2017, hold a 4–3 advantage over the Tigers in games played at Fluor Field. The field has also hosted several regular season collegiate baseball games for South Carolina-based schools since its opening.

Milestones and notable moments
 First pitch: Phil Seibel, on April 6 at 7:35 pm
 First hit: Jesús Soto, on April 6, 2006, in the 4th inning
 First Drive hit: Jeff Natale, April 6, 2006, in the 4th inning
 First home run: Jesús Soto, April 6, 2006, in the 4th inning
 First Drive home run:  Jeff Natale, April 6, 2006, in the 4th inning

Attendance records
 Highest season attendance: Over 350,000 (2012)
 Highest single game attendance: 7,839 (April 24, 2022, (Greenville Drive vs. Winston-Salem Dash)

References

External links
 Fluor Field at the West End

Sports venues in Greenville, South Carolina
Minor league baseball venues
Baseball venues in South Carolina
Sports venues completed in 2006
2006 establishments in South Carolina
South Atlantic League ballparks
Baseball in Greenville, South Carolina